RAF Warwick is a former Royal Air Force relief landing ground located  south west of Warwick, Warwickshire, England. RAF Warwick was opened on a large grass field called Tournament Field in December 1941 and was closed on 4 February 1946.

History

The first unit to use the station was No. 1 Flying Instructors School (FIS) operating Airspeed Oxfords and Avro Tutors which taught flying instructors. The main base was RAF Church Lawford but Warwick and RAF Hockley Heath were satellites where aircraft were dispersed. 1FIS was previously No. 2 Central Flying School RAF but changed to the current name on 13 January 1941. On 27 October 1942 1FIS was disbanded and turned into No. 18 (Pilots) Advanced Flying Unit RAF ((P)AFU).

No. 18 (P)AFU flew Oxfords and Boulton Paul Defiants mainly from RAF Church Lawford but Warwick and other stations were used as satellites. The unit operated between 27 October 1942 and 29 May 1945.

Accidents and incidents
RAF Warwick had its fair share of accidents with a number listed between 1942 and 1945. These are just a small number of examples:

Current use

The relief landing ground has been changed since the closure of the station with most of the hangars and all of the buildings demolished, this includes the building of Aylesford School and Sixth Form College and the creation of a business park called Tournament Fields.

References

External links
 Aviation Archaeology - Flying units within the south-west Midlands

Airports in England
Royal Air Force stations in Warwickshire
Royal Air Force stations of World War II in the United Kingdom